The canton of Val-de-Reuil is an administrative division of the Eure department, northern France. Its borders were modified at the French canton reorganisation which came into effect in March 2015. Its seat is in Val-de-Reuil.

It consists of the following communes:

Amfreville-sous-les-Monts
Connelles
Herqueville
Léry
Porte-de-Seine
Poses
Val-de-Reuil
Le Vaudreuil

References

Cantons of Eure